EC 11507-2253 is a post-AGB star located about 81,000 light years, or 25 kpc, away from Earth in the constellation of Corvus. Located in the distant galactic halo, over 50,000 light years above the galactic plane, EC 11507-2253 is very isolated and the rest of its life (likely only a few tens of thousands of years) will be spent in the halo as well, far from much of the stellar population. The apparent magnitude is only about 15, and it was only discovered in 1997 in a survey for blue objects at high latitudes (above the galactic plane).

Properties 

EC 11507-2253 is quite a hot post-AGB star. Initial analysis of its spectrum upon its discovery in 1997 yielded a spectral type of B5. Analysis of its spectrum in 2005 has revealed a temperature of about 15,500 K, which makes sense given its spectral type.

In 2015, a distance catalogue of post-AGB stars based on an assumed luminosity given the post-AGB star type and location was made, which included EC 11507-2253, which was assigned an estimated luminosity of  based on its status as an outer halo post-AGB star. This also yielded its distance value of 24.93 kpc.

References 

B-type stars
Post-asymptotic-giant-branch stars
Corvus (constellation)